Fish-liver oil may refer to:

 Cod liver oil, an oil extracted from cod livers
 Shark liver oil